P. Jayadevi is an Indian film director, producer and screenwriter who has worked on Tamil films. Regarded as one of the first female directors in the Tamil film industry, Jayadevi was predominantly active in the 1980s and 1990s.

Career
Having begun her career as a theatre artist, Jayadevi began acting in films aged 20 and initially nursed ambitions of becoming a director. She appeared as an actress in over 20 films, before working as a producer and making over 15 films, and introducing technicians such as P. C. Sreeram and Velu Prabhakaran through her ventures.

She first worked as a director in Nalam Nalamariya Aaval (1984), and subsequently went on to make more films throughout the 1980s and 1990s.

In 2000, she worked as a writer on Puratchikkaaran, a script based on the teachings of Periyar and his book entitled Kadavul. The film's controversial theme prompted publicity prior to release, with Jayadevi's work on the film's dialogues being praised. She started making Power of Women (2005) in 2001 but the film had a delayed release following production trouble. The film starred Hariharan and Khushbu in the lead roles, with a reviewer from the AllIndianSite labelling the film as "below average", noting that "Jayadevi's story is initially strong", but "the last few scenes are unpardonably slow and didactic" and that the "screenplay meanders through undulating terrain".

In 2010, Jayadevi began work on Aananda Leelai, a film about fake godmen and their women devotees. She approached Khushbu and Suhasini to play the key roles, but the project did not develop into production. She announced her intentions of directing a film during 2018.

Personal life
Jayadevi was previously married to film director Velu Prabhakaran.

Partial filmography

References

External links

Living people
20th-century Indian film directors
Tamil film directors
Film directors from Chennai
Indian women film directors
Tamil screenwriters
Indian women screenwriters
Screenwriters from Chennai
Women artists from Tamil Nadu
Year of birth missing (living people)
20th-century Indian women